Kipnis or Kipniss is a Jewish surname originating in Ukraine. Notable people with the surname include:

Alexander Kipnis (1891–1978), Russian/Ukrainian/American operatic bass
Igor Kipnis (1930–2002), German-born American harpsichordist and pianist
Jason Kipnis (born 1987), American baseball player (second baseman; Chicago Cubs)
Joel Kipnis (aka JK), producer, writer, soul/R&B guitarist, and recording studio owner
 Jonathan Kipnis, professor of pathology and immunology at the Washington University School of Medicine
Laura Kipnis (born 1956), American professor of media studies at Northwestern University
Levin Kipnis (1894–1990), Russian/Ukrainian-born Israeli children's author and poet; winner of the Israel Prize
Jeff Kipnis (born 1951), American architectural critic, theorist, designer, film-maker, curator, and educator
Menachem Kipnis (1878–1942), Polish singer, critic, and photographer
Robert Kipniss (born 1931), American painter and printmaker
Yigal Kipnis (born 1949), Israeli historian and author

 Jewish surnames